Chahar Sotun (also Romanized as Chahār Sotūn) is a village in Koreh Soni Rural District, in the Central District of Salmas County, West Azerbaijan Province, Iran. At the 2006 census, its population was 446, in 87 families.

References 

Populated places in Salmas County